Verkhny Dvor is a rural locality (a village) in Semizerye Rural Settlement, Kaduysky District, Vologda Oblast, Russia. The population was 43 as of 2002.

Geography 
Verkhny Dvor is located 45 km northwest of Kaduy (the district's administrative centre) by road. Shoborovo is the nearest rural locality.

References 

Rural localities in Kaduysky District